Surendra Kumar Surana is the Managing Director and CEO of Compucom Software Limited,  Jaipur which is listed in National Stock Exchange of India and Bombay Stock Exchange, and the Editor-In-Chief of satellite television network, Jan TV.

Personal background
Surana attended the Netarhat Residential School in Bihar and earned his Bachelor of Technology undergraduate degree in Electrical Engineering from BITS Pilani.

Professional background
Following graduation from BITS Pilani, Surana has worked in software development(also later through Compucom) and consulting with Bell Atlantic.

References

External links
 Compucom profile
 CITM Board of Governors profile
 Compucom Board of Directors profile
 Bloomberg profile
 Mr. Surana on CNBC TV channel
 Mr. Surana on CNBC TV channel speaking on QIP
 Mr. Surana interview on CNBC TV channel
 Mr. Surana on Doordarshan TV channel (DD Rajasthan) in Dharti Dhora Ri morning program

Birla Institute of Technology and Science, Pilani alumni
Year of birth missing (living people)
Living people